Book and Sword Chronicles is a Taiwanese television series adapted from Louis Cha's novel The Book and the Sword. It was first broadcast on TTV in Taiwan in 1984.

Cast
 Yu Tien-lung as Chen Jialuo / Qianlong Emperor
 Sam-Sam as Huoqingtong
 Yang Liyin as Princess Fragrance
 Tang Tai as Yu Yutong
 Ban-Ban as Li Yuanzhi
 Tsai Hong as Wen Tailai
 Angela Mao as Luo Bing
 Chang Ying-chi as Xu Tianhong
 Shang-kuan Ming-li as Zhou Qi
 Lu Di as Lu Feiqing
 Tien Feng as Zhang Zhaozhong
 Wan Chieh as Zhou Zhongying
 Cheng Hsiao-wei as Mrs Zhou
 Yi Yuen as Yuan Shixiao
 Lung Fei as Yu Wanting
 Han Chiang as Zhaohui
 Chen Chen as Tong Zhaohe
 He Wei-hsiung as Yan Shizhang
 Hu Kuang as Li Kexiu
 Zhang Yuen as Mrs Li
 Chin Hao as Zeng Tunan
 Fan Wei as Muzhuolun
 Hu Chun as Nasreddin
 Pan Chang-ming as Shi Shuangying
 Ma Chi-jen as Zhang Jin
 Yu Sung-chao as Jiang Sigen
 Lung Wei as Meng Jianxiong
 Chang Yi-kui as Rui Dalin

External links
 

Taiwanese wuxia television series
1984 Taiwanese television series debuts
1984 Taiwanese television series endings
Television series set in the Qing dynasty
Works based on The Book and the Sword
Television shows about rebels
Television shows based on works by Jin Yong